The Oliver Sturges House is a historic building in Savannah, Georgia, United States, built in 1813. It is located in the southwestern trust block of Reynolds Square, and it was placed on the National Register of Historic Places in 1971. The building has also been known as the Hiram Roberts House. Roberts lived from 1806 to 1880. The house was originally two floors; a third was added in 1835.

The lot the building stands on was the site set aside by the Trustees of the Colony of Georgia for the minister at Savannah. A 1733 map shows an earlier house on the site. In 1736–37, John Wesley, a missionary of the Church of England and later the founder of Methodism, lived there.

The earliest view of the building is depicted by Firmin Cerveau, detail painter and watercolorist, in 1837. The painting now hangs in the Georgia Historical Society's offices.

In 1964, the Historic Savannah Foundation saved the building from demolition.

The property sits directly across East Saint Julian Street from The Olde Pink House, which was constructed 24 years earlier. It has been the home of Morris Multimedia since 1971.

Gallery

See also
Buildings in Savannah Historic District
List of historic houses and buildings in Savannah, Georgia

References

External links
 

Houses completed in 1813
Historic house museums in Georgia (U.S. state)
Historic American Buildings Survey in Georgia (U.S. state)
Houses in Savannah, Georgia
National Register of Historic Places in Savannah, Georgia
Reynolds Square (Savannah) buildings
Savannah Historic District